Nigel Ronald Anthony de Gruchy (born 28 January 1943) is a British former trade union official.

Career
De Gruchy attended De La Salle College on Jersey, then the University of Reading, where he graduated with a BA in Economics and History.  After a few years teaching English in Spain and France, during which time he received qualifications in French from the University of Paris and the Alliance Française, he completed a Postgraduate Certificate in Education at the University of London.  He became a teacher at St Joseph's Academy, Blackheath in London, rising to become its head of economics, and also joined the National Association of Schoolmasters Union of Women Teachers (NASUWT), first being elected to its national executive in 1975.

NASUWT
In 1978, de Gruchy became the full-time Assistant Secretary of the NASUWT, then in 1983 he became Deputy General Secretary, and in 1990 was elected as General Secretary of the union.

As leader of the union, de Gruchy opposed the introduction of the National Curriculum.  His opposition was a major reason why the Labour Party, on coming to power, commissioned the Dearing Report into education.  De Gruchy also opposed the introduction of literacy and numeracy hours, and rejected a mooted merger between the NASUWT and rival teachers' unions.  He retired as General Secretary in April 2002, but maintained connections with the union, writing History of the NASUWT 1919–2002: the story of a battling minority, which was published in 2013.

Politics
On retirement from the NASUWT, de Gruchy served for a year as President of the Trades Union Congress.  In 2007, he was chosen as secretary of the Orpington Labour Party.  He fought Orpington as the Labour candidate in both 2015 and 2017, being defeated on both occasions by the Conservative incumbent Jo Johnson.  In 2015, at 72 years and 3 months, he claimed that he was the oldest first-time candidate to stand in the election, whereas in fact Ian Sanderson (Liberal Democrat, Romford) was the oldest at 73 years and 8 months.)

References

External links
 Describing politicians as 'self-seeking, self-opinionated rogues' in April 2002

1943 births
Living people
Alumni of University of London Worldwide
Alumni of the University of London
Alumni of the University of Reading
Jersey people
General Secretaries of NASUWT
University of Paris alumni
Members of the General Council of the Trades Union Congress
Presidents of the Trades Union Congress
People educated at De La Salle College, Jersey
British expatriates in France